August Wilhelm Trabandt (21 July 1891 – 19 May 1968) was a German SS functionary during the Nazi era. He commanded the 1st SS Infantry Brigade and the SS Division Horst Wessel during World War II.

SS career
Trabandt was born in Berlin, Germany on the 21 July 1891. In May 1936, Trabandt volunteered to join the SS-VT. At the start of World War II, Trabandt was the commander of the III. Battalion, Leibstandarte SS Adolf Hitler Regiment. He took part in the Invasion of Poland and the Battle of France. Facing accusations of smuggling following the campaign, Trabandt was posted to the 1st SS Infantry Brigade that was charged with the Nazi security warfare and the murder of the Jewish population in the occupied territories in the Soviet Union. He was given command of the SS Panzergrenadier Regiment 39 in March 1943, and took over command of the Brigade in September 1943.

Trabandt was awarded the Knight's Cross on 6 January 1944, just before the Brigade was disbanded and used to form the cadre of the SS Division Horst Wessel. Trabandt was given command of the division and remained in command until April 1945. After the war had ended, Trabandt was imprisoned in the Soviet Union until 1954. He died on 19 May 1968, in Hamburg, Germany.

References

Further reading

 

 

1891 births
1968 deaths
Military personnel from Berlin
People from the Province of Brandenburg
SS-Brigadeführer
Recipients of the clasp to the Iron Cross, 1st class
Recipients of the Gold German Cross
Recipients of the Knight's Cross of the Iron Cross
German Army personnel of World War I
German prisoners of war in World War II held by the Soviet Union
Waffen-SS personnel